Albania participated in the Eurovision Song Contest 2004 in Istanbul, Turkey, with the song "The Image of You" performed by Anjeza Shahini. Its selected entry was chosen through the national selection competition Festivali i Këngës organised by Radio Televizioni Shqiptar (RTSH) in December 2003. This marked the first time that Albania participated in the Eurovision Song Contest. The nation was drawn to compete in the semi-final of the contest, which took place on 12 May 2004. Performing as number 13, it was announced among the top 10 entries of the semi-final and therefore qualified to compete in the final. In the final on 15 May, Albania performed as number nine and placed seventh out of the 24 participating countries, scoring 106 points.

Background 

The nation had previously planned to debut at the Eurovision Song Contest in 2003, however, the nation was unable to take part that year after the European Broadcasting Union (EBU) decided that too many countries would be relegated from participation in 2003 if the country took part. The country's national broadcaster, Radio Televizioni Shqiptar (RTSH), chose the annual competition Festivali i Këngës as the selection method to determine Albania's representative for the contest.

Before Eurovision

Festivali i Këngës 

RTSH organised the 42nd edition of Festivali i Këngës to determine Albania's representative for the Eurovision Song Contest 2004. The competition consisted of two semi-finals on 18 and 19 December, respectively, and the grand final on 20 December 2003. The three live shows were hosted by Albanian singer Ledina Çelo and presenter Adi Krasta.

Competing entries

Shows

Semi-finals 

The semi-finals of Festivali i Këngës took place on 18 December and 19 December 2003, respectively. 14 contestants participated in the first semi-final and 15 in the second semi-final, with the highlighted ones progressing to the grand final.

Final 
The grand final of Festivali i Këngës took place on 20 December 2003. The results of the competition were determined by a 50/50 combination of votes from a jury panel and a public televote. Anjeza Shahini emerged as the winner with "Imazhi yt" and was simultaneously announced as Albania's representative for the Eurovision Song Contest 2004.

Key:
 Winner
 Second place
 Third place

At Eurovision 

The Eurovision Song Contest 2004 took place at Abdi İpekçi Arena in Istanbul, Turkey, and consisted of a semi-final on 12 May and the grand final on 15 May 2004. For the first time, a semi-final round was introduced in order to accommodate the influx of nations that wanted to compete in the contest. A debuting country, Albania was set to compete in the semi-final of the Eurovision Song Contest 2004 at position 13, following  and preceding . At the end of the show, the nation was announced among the top 10 entries of the semi-final and therefore qualified to compete in the grand final of the contest. In the grand final, it was announced that it would be performing ninth, following  and preceding .

Voting 

The tables below visualise a breakdown of points awarded to Albania in the semi-final and grand final of the Eurovision Song Contest 2004, as well as by the nation on both occasions. The nation awarded its 12 points to Greece in both the semi-final and final of the contest.

Points awarded to Albania

Points awarded by Albania

References 

2004
Countries in the Eurovision Song Contest 2004
2003
Eurovision
Eurovision